Kang Daniel is a South Korean singer-songwriter, actor, and businessman. While promoting with South Korean boy group Wanna One, he received nine individual awards (including two variety rookie awards for his work on SBS's Master Key and MBC's It's Dangerous Beyond the Blankets). He officially debuted as a solo artist in July 2019 with the extended play (EP), Color on Me. The EPs lead single "What Are You Up To" earned him the Best Music Video award at the 2019 Melon Music Awards. For his accomplishments the following year, Kang won four bonsang awards from the APAN Music Awards, the Soribada Best K-Music Awards, the Seoul Music Awards, and The Fact Music Awards. He also won Stage of the Year at the 2020 Soribada Best K-Music Awards which was previously a daesang award. After the release of his fourth EP, Kang won Song of the Year in April for its lead single "Antidote" as the only male soloist to do so at the 11th Gaon Chart Music Awards. Overall, Kang has won 74 awards from 111 nominations since the start of his career in 2017.

In other accolades, Kang has attained a Guinness World Record for gaining one million followers on Instagram in the shortest amount of time. In 2017, Naver reported that Kang was included on its list of 'Most Searched Keywords' as the only singer in the top six, placing right below the president of South Korea. According to the KBS News list of 'Most Mentioned Figures in TV and Entertainment for 2018', Kang was the only individual among groups in the top three. He was also the only individual among groups in the Forbes 2019 'Korea Power Celebrity' list to place in the top four.

Alongside his music career, Kang made his acting debut through the 2022 Disney+ Star original series, Rookie Cops. This role earned him multiple awards including Rookie of the Year in television or film at the Asia Artist Awards. In the same year, he was selected for the Seoul Mayor's Award for Culture due to his great contribution to the rise of Seoul's awareness by promoting Hallyu in various fields. Aside from the entertainment industry, Kang is also known for his involvement in philanthropic activities and received a plaque of recognition from The Snail of Love, a social welfare group for the deaf and hard of hearing.

Awards and nominations

Other accolades

Honors

Listicles

World record

See also
List of awards and nominations received by Wanna One
Konnect Entertainment § Accolade

Notes

References

Awards
Kang Daniel